The Toro Rosso STR8 (initially referred to as the Toro Rosso STR08) is a Formula One racing car designed and built by Scuderia Toro Rosso for use in the 2013 Formula One season. It was driven by Daniel Ricciardo and Jean-Éric Vergne, both of whom drove for the team in 2012. 

This was the last Toro Rosso car to use a Ferrari engine (from 2011). Ferrari engines had powered the team since 2007 before switching to Renault engine for 2014 Formula One season. This was also the last Toro Rosso car to use a V8 engine, before being replaced with the V6 engine for 2014.

Complete Formula One results
(key) (results in bold indicate pole position; results in italics indicate fastest lap)

 Driver failed to finish the race, but was classified as they had completed greater than 90% of the race distance.

Notes

References

External links

The official Scuderia Toro Rosso site
Red Bull F1 Portal 

Toro Rosso STR8